Cristóbal Mantilla (born 28 November 1949) is an Ecuadorian footballer. He played in 14 matches for the Ecuador national football team from 1972 to 1979. He was also part of Ecuador's squad for the 1979 Copa América tournament.

References

External links
 

1949 births
Living people
Ecuadorian footballers
Footballers from Quito
Ecuador international footballers
Association football forwards